Events in the year 2016 in Colombia.

Incumbents

 President: Juan Manuel Santos
 Vice President: Germán Vargas Lleras

Events

2 October – the Colombian peace agreement referendum failed with 50.2% voting against it and 49.8% voting in favor.
7 October – the 2016 Nobel Peace Prize was awarded to the President of Colombia Juan Manuel Santos.
28 November – the LaMia Flight 2933 crashed, killing 71 people.
30 November – the Congress ratified a revised peace accord with the FARC.

Sport
5-21 August – Colombia at the 2016 Summer Olympics: 147 competitors in 23 sports (3 gold, 2 silver, 3 bronze medals)

Deaths

16 February – Gregorio Garavito Jiménez, Roman Catholic bishop (b. 1919).

22 March – Javier de Nicoló, salesian priest (b. 1928).

23 March – Gloria Galeano Garcés, botanist and agronomist (b. 1958).
31 March – Aníbal Alzate, footballer (b. 1933).

3 April – Phanor Arizabaleta-Arzayus, criminal (b. 1937)
11 April – Édgar Perea, politician and football commentator (b. 1934)
17 April – Luis Horacio Gomez González, Roman Catholic bishop (b. 1958)
2 May – Fernando Soto Aparicio, poet, storyteller, playwright, novelist, librettist, and screenwriter (b. 1933)
16 August – Jorge García Isaza, Roman Catholic bishop (b. 1928)
27 October – Nelson Pinedo, singer (b. 1928)
18 December – Gustavo Quintero, singer-songwriter (b. 1939)

References

 
2010s in Colombia
Years of the 21st century in Colombia
Colombia
Colombia